Alan Phillips is the name of:

Alan Phillips (baseball) (born 1956), South African baseball player
Alan Phillips (chess player) (1923–2009), British chess player
Alan Phillips (rugby union) (born 1954), Welsh rugby player

See also 
Allan Phillips, Venezuelan composer
Allan Robert Phillips, American ornithologist